"Mr. Bean" is the pilot episode of the British television series Mr. Bean, produced by Tiger Television for Thames Television. It was first broadcast on ITV on 1 January 1990 and was watched by 13.45 million viewers during its original transmission.

The episode, written by Ben Elton, Richard Curtis and Rowan Atkinson, also featured special guest Richard Briers alongside Paul Bown, Rudolph Walker (who would later co-star with Atkinson in The Thin Blue Line) and a cameo appearance by theme music composer Howard Goodall.

Plot

Act 1: The Exam 
Mr. Bean is late for a mathematics exam and speeds past a blue Reliant Regal in his Mini (which would become a running gag later throughout the series), running it off the road and nearly overturning it in the process. Arriving at the college he has been attending, Bean finds himself sitting next to a fellow student (Paul Bown) who asks him if he did his revision. Bean replies that he has been concentrating on trigonometry, to which the student says that he has studied calculus. Bean then says he believes calculus was the focus of the previous year's exam, rendering the other student worried while Bean snickers to himself for deceiving him. The invigilator (Rudolph Walker) announces that the exam will start in two minutes. During those two minutes, Bean prepares himself by getting out many pens, as well as a policeman doll, a Pink Panther doll and a Mickey Mouse alarm clock, which he sets for when the exam finishes.

The exam starts and Bean panics when he takes a calculus paper out of the envelope (as he had not studied calculus at all). He gradually becomes frustrated and has no idea how to complete it, so he resorts to spending most of the exam time trying to cheat and copy the other student's work (even going as far as stealing the student's paper when he becomes distracted at one point), but each attempt fails. Eventually, Bean gives up and cries out "Oh, Mummy!" before placing his head on the desk and sleeping for the remainder of the exam.

Two minutes before the end, the invigilator gives instructions on what to do with the papers once the exam is over. From this, Bean realises that there were two papers in the envelope – a green calculus paper and a white trigonometry paper, with each student given a choice as to which to do (although the invigilator logically should have stated this at the beginning). Bean takes out the trigonometry paper and frantically tries to complete it hurriedly, but his pen has run out of ink and will not write anything, so he steals the other student's pen (forgetting about the many spares he came prepared with). Unfortunately, the exam finishes and the invigilator instructs the students to stop writing. But Bean is determined to finish the exam and continues, and he finally stops when the invigilator furiously tells him to stop writing for the third time. At this point, his alarm clock starts ringing and Bean frantically attempts to silence it.

Act 2: The Beach 
After his exam, Bean heads to the Peacehaven beach, running the Reliant Regal off the road once again in the process. Reaching the beachfront, he looks forward to his swim in the sea but finds himself unable to change into his swimming trunks without exposing himself to a man (Roger Sloman) wearing sunglasses sitting in a nearby deckchair. Not wishing to travel back up the steps he climbed down to change, he puts his trunks on over his trousers and eventually manages to remove his trousers by pulling one leg out, passing the trouser leg through his trunks and then pulling the trousers off the other leg. Although this plan works, Bean then sees the man grabbing his white cane and leaving, revealing that he was blind all along.

Act 3: The Church 
After his beach outing, Bean attends a church service, pushing out the Reliant from its parking space near to the Stanmer Church. Heading inside, he arrives as the opening hymn, "Eternal Father, Strong to Save", has finished and takes a seat next to Mr. Sprout (Richard Briers). As the vicar (voiced by Rowan Atkinson off-screen) gives his sermon, Bean sneezes loudly and finds himself needing to wipe his nose, effectively using the lining of one of his coat pockets to do so as he does not have a tissue or handkerchief. Finding the sermon to be very dull, he does everything to keep himself awake, eventually trying to put a sweet into his mouth. However, the watchful eye of Mr. Sprout causes Bean to conceal this a few times, accidentally making him drop it inside his shirt just as the second hymn, "All Creatures of Our God and King", is about to be sung. While the hymn is going on, Bean manages to move the sweet through his shirt and his trousers, picking it up off the ground. As the hymn comes to an end, Bean attempts to eat it only for Mr. Sprout to abruptly look his way at the last second and make him accidentally put it into the pocket he used to wipe his nose, much to Bean's dismay.

As the end credits roll, Mr. Bean is seen again driving in his Mini and once again encounters the Reliant, whereupon he turns the wrong way down a one-way street and crashes his car (off-screen) while the Reliant drives off. Coming out unscathed, Bean promptly runs off down the other road, shortly after a wheel from his Mini bounces from the accident and rolls against the pavement.

Cast 
 Rowan Atkinson as Mr. Bean and the vicar (off-camera)
 Paul Bown as the fellow student
 Rudolph Walker as the examination invigilator
 Roger Sloman as the blind man on the beach
 Howard Goodall as the church organist
 Richard Briers as Mr. Sprout

Production 
Following success with his character during his introduction at the Montreal comedy festival Just for Laughs in 1987, a script was written by Ben Elton, making this the only script he wrote for the series. Thames Television commissioned the pilot in 1989. The company's head of light entertainment, John Howard Davies, personally oversaw the first three episodes of the series as its producer and director.

The pilot itself was produced during the latter part of 1989, with location scenes filmed on OB videotape around the Peacehaven and Stanmer areas of East Sussex and interior scenes recorded before a live audience at Thames' Teddington Studios complex.

As the episode was merely a pilot, it was simply called "Mr. Bean" and did not feature opening titles, nor the choral theme tune. Instead, the episode's title was superimposed along with initial credits during the scene of Bean's journey to the exam hall, with the closing credits during the final scene. The remastered version of the episode adds the standard opening titles and removes the credits from the opening scene.

In 1991, it was announced 20th Century Fox had a feature film adaptation of Mr. Bean in development. They remade Act 1 into a short film: Mr. Bean Takes an Exam and attached it to their theatrical releases. It was also included on the UK VHS rental release of Hot Shots! Part Deux. John McGlynn portrayed the fellow student and John Savident portrayed the exam  invigilator.

Awards and legacy 
The pilot won the 1990 Golden Rose award, with the church sketch later performed live by both Rowan Atkinson and Angus Deayton as part of a comedy tour in 1991. This same sketch inspired the storyline for "Ray of Sunshine" from Mr. Bean: The Animated Series.

References

External links 
 

Mr. Bean episodes
British television series premieres
1990 British television episodes
Television shows written by Ben Elton
Television shows written by Rowan Atkinson
Television shows written by Richard Curtis